Tokenization may refer to:

 Tokenization (lexical analysis) in language processing
 Tokenization (data security) in the field of data security
 Word segmentation
 Tokenism of minorities